Juraj Blanár (born 16 May 1966 in Žilina) is a Slovak politician. He has served as a member of the National Council since 2010. He also served as an MP in the 2002-2006 term. Since 2020 he has been the Deputy Speaker of the National Council. Between 2005 and 2017 he served as the Governor of the Žilina Region. He is a member of the Direction – Slovak Social Democracy party.  Blanár graduated from the University of Žilina and has three children.

References 

People from Žilina
Direction – Social Democracy politicians
1966 births
Living people
Members of the National Council (Slovakia) 2002-2006
Members of the National Council (Slovakia) 2010-2012
Members of the National Council (Slovakia) 2016-2020
Members of the National Council (Slovakia) 2012-2016
Members of the National Council (Slovakia) 2020-present
21st-century Slovak politicians